Sheik Mahaboob Subhani is an Indian classical music nadaswaram artist. He performs with his wife Kaleeshabi Mahaboob, also a nadaswaram artist.

Early life
Sheik Mahaboob Subhani was born in Prakasam district in Andhra Pradesh. His father Kothapalli Sheikh Meera Sahib, and his maternal grandfather, Nadhabrahma Nadaswara Ganakala Prapoorna Janab Sheikh Chinna Peer Sahib, were also nadhaswaram artists.

He received training at Sarada Sangeetha Kalasala, Kurnool and later under legendary instrumentalist, Sheikh Chinna Moulana Sahib.

Career
Sheik Mahaboob Subhani started his performing when he was seven, but due to family circumstances he had to work as a clerk in a tobacco company.

He renders popular carnatic ragas and kritis on nagaswaram.

References

Living people
Musicians from Andhra Pradesh
Nadaswaram players
Year of birth missing (living people)